Nannophya is a genus of dragonfly in the family Libellulidae. 
They are found in Asia and Australia.
They are commonly known as Pygmyflies.
Species of Nannophya are small to tiny dragonflies often brightly coloured. It includes Nannophya pygmaea, the scarlet dwarf, which is considered to be the world's smallest dragonfly.

Species
The genus Nannophya includes the following species:

References

Libellulidae
Anisoptera genera
Odonata of Australia
Odonata of Asia
Taxa named by Jules Pierre Rambur